Fúquene is a municipality and town of Colombia in the department of Cundinamarca. The municipality borders Ubaté, Susa, Guachetá and the department of Boyacá. Fúquene is located 116 km northwest from the capital Bogotá.

History 
Fúquene, in the north of the present department of Cundinamarca, was in the centuries before the Spanish conquest inhabited by the Muisca. The village was located in the border region of the northern Muisca territories, ruled by the zaque of Hunza, the southern Muisca area with the zipa based in Bacatá and the independent territories in the northwest. A lake within the boundaries of Fúquene, Lake Fúquene was considered a sacred site in the religion of the Muisca.

With the arrival of the Spanish conquistadores many indigenous people fled to an island in Lake Fúquene. Modern Fúquene was first established by one of the few female founders in 1542, Teresa de Verdugo. The town was properly founded on November 6th, 1638 by Gabriel Carvajal.

Etymology 
The name Fúquene is either derived from the Chibcha words fú and quyny, meaning "bed of the fox", or named after the god Fu, who inhabited the lake defending the terrain against the Muzo; "bed of Fu".

Economy 
Main economical activities of Fúquene are livestock farming and agriculture, mainly potatoes, tomatoes, maize and fruits as strawberries.

References 

Municipalities of Cundinamarca Department
Populated places established in 1638
1638 establishments in the Spanish Empire
Muisca Confederation
Muysccubun